Diplostomum is a genus of flatworms belonging to the family Diplostomidae.

Species:
 Diplostomum auriflavum
 Diplostomum baeri
 Diplostomum chromatophorum
Diplostomum pseudospathaceum

References

Diplostomida
Rhabditophora genera